The iris hypothesis is a hypothesis proposed by Richard Lindzen et al. in 2001 that suggested increased sea surface temperature in the tropics would result in reduced cirrus clouds and thus more infrared radiation leakage from Earth's atmosphere.  His study of observed changes in cloud coverage and modeled effects on infrared radiation released to space as a result supported the hypothesis.  This suggested infrared radiation leakage was hypothesized to be a negative feedback in which an initial warming would result in an overall cooling of the surface. The consensus view is that increased sea surface temperature would result in increased cirrus clouds and reduced infrared radiation leakage and therefore a positive feedback.

Other scientists subsequently tested the hypothesis.  Some concluded that there was no evidence supporting the hypothesis. Others found evidence suggesting that increased sea surface temperature in the tropics did indeed reduce cirrus clouds but found that the effect was nonetheless a positive feedback rather than the negative feedback that Lindzen had hypothesized. 

A later 2007 study conducted by Roy Spencer et al. using updated satellite data potentially supported the iris hypothesis.  In 2011, Lindzen published a rebuttal to the main criticisms.  In 2015, a paper was published which again suggested the possibility of an "Iris Effect".  It also proposed what it called a "plausible physical mechanism for an iris effect."  In 2017, a paper was published which found that "tropical anvil cirrus clouds exert a negative climate feedback in strong association with precipitation efficiency".  If confirmed then that finding would be highly supportive of the existence of an "Iris Effect".

See also
Fixed anvil temperature hypothesis
Global dimming
Global warming

References

External links
NASA summary of Global Warming and Iris Hypothesis (June 2002)

Climatology
Climate change feedbacks